Morpeth was a constituency centred on the town of Morpeth in Northumberland represented in the House of Commons of the Parliament of England from 1553 to 1707, the Parliament of Great Britain from 1707 to 1800, and then the Parliament of the United Kingdom from 1800 to 1983.

The Parliamentary Borough of Morpeth first sent Members (MPs) to Parliament in 1553. It elected two MPs under the bloc vote system until the 1832 general election, when the Great Reform Act reduced its representation to one MP, elected under the first past the post system. The seat was redesignated as a county constituency for the 1950 general election and abolished for the 1983 general election.

Boundaries

1832-1868 
The parliamentary borough, as defined by the Parliamentary Boundaries Act 1832, comprised the township of Morpeth and several surrounding townships, as well as the parish of Bedlington.

1868-1918 
Under the Boundary Act 1868, the borough was expanded to include the townships of Cowpen and Newsham, which incorporated the town of Blyth.

No changes were made by the Redistribution of Seats Act 1885.

1918–1950 

 the Municipal Borough of Morpeth 
 the Urban Districts of Ashington, Bedlingtonshire, and Blyth 
 part of the Rural District of Morpeth

The boundaries were largely unchanged, except for the addition of Ashington.

1950–1983 

 the Municipal Borough of Morpeth 
 the Urban Districts of Ashington and Newbiggin-by-the-Sea
 the Rural District of Morpeth.

Blyth and Bedlington formed the basis of the new constituency of Blyth. Newbiggin-by-the-Sea and the remainder (bulk) of the Rural District of Morpeth was transferred from Wansbeck, which was now abolished.

Abolition 
On abolition in 1983, 6 rural wards to the north of Morpeth were transferred to Berwick-upon-Tweed. The remainder of the seat formed the basis of the re-established constituency of Wansbeck.

Members of Parliament

1553–1640

1640–1832

1832–1983

Election results

Elections in the 1830s

Howard's death caused a by-election.

Howard resigned, causing a by-election.

Elections in the 1840s
Leveson-Gower resigned by accepting the office of Steward of the Chiltern Hundreds, causing a by-election.

Elections in the 1850s

Howard resigned, causing a by-election.

Grey was appointed Secretary of State for the Colonies, requiring a by-election.

Grey was appointed Chancellor of the Duchy of Lancaster, requiring a by-election.

Elections in the 1860s
Grey was appointed Home Secretary, requiring a by-election.

Elections in the 1870s

Elections in the 1880s

Elections in the 1890s

Elections in the 1900s

Elections in the 1910s 

 Newton received support from the local branch of the National Federation of Discharged and Demobilized Sailors and Soldiers

Elections in the 1920s

Elections in the 1930s

Elections in the 1940s

Elections in the 1950s

Elections in the 1960s

Elections in the 1970s

References

Robert Beatson, A Chronological Register of Both Houses of Parliament (London: Longman, Hurst, Res & Orme, 1807) 
D Brunton & D H Pennington, Members of the Long Parliament (London: George Allen & Unwin, 1954)
Cobbett's Parliamentary history of England, from the Norman Conquest in 1066 to the year 1803 (London: Thomas Hansard, 1808)

See also 
 History of parliamentary constituencies and boundaries in Northumberland
 1923 Morpeth by-election

Parliamentary constituencies in Northumberland (historic)
Constituencies of the Parliament of the United Kingdom established in 1553
Constituencies of the Parliament of the United Kingdom disestablished in 1983
Morpeth, Northumberland